Basquiñuelas is a hamlet and council located in the municipality of Ribera Alta/Erriberagoitia, in Álava province, Basque Country, Spain. As of 2020, it has a population of 5.

Geography 
Basquiñuelas is located 28km west of Vitoria-Gasteiz.

References

Populated places in Álava